Chubeh (also Romanized as Chūbeh; also known as Chuba) is a village in Kasma Rural District, in the Central District of Sowme'eh Sara County, Gilan Province, Iran. At the 2006 census, its population was 787, in 230 families.

References 

Populated places in Sowme'eh Sara County